Bill Marsh (1929-2002) was an Australian professional rugby league footballer who played in the 1950s. A New South Wales interstate and Australia international representative forward, he played his club football in Sydney's NSWRFL Premiership for Balmain, who he also captained.

Marsh started playing for Balmain in the NSWRFL Premiership's first grade in 1950.  He was selected to play for the New South Wales team against France and Queensland in 1955. He also won an award for being the best Sydney footballer that year.

After moving to Cootamundra as captain-coach in 1956, Marsh gained selection for the Country New South Wales team and then became Kangaroo No. 329 when he represented Australia on the 1956-57 Kangaroo tour, playing in Tests against Great Britain and France. Marsh returned to Balmain for the 1957 NSWRFL season and helped host country Australia to victory in the 1957 Rugby League World Cup tournament. In 1958 Marsh was in the front row in the Australian Test team in all three Tests against the Ashes-winning Great Britain team.

References

1929 births
2002 deaths
Australian rugby league players
Australian rugby league coaches
Australia national rugby league team players
Balmain Tigers captains
Balmain Tigers players
New South Wales rugby league team players
City New South Wales rugby league team players
Country New South Wales rugby league team players
Rugby league players from Sydney